Amine oxidase, copper containing 2 (AOC2) is a protein that in humans is encoded by the AOC2 gene. The protein is a copper-containing primary amine oxidase enzyme.

Function

Copper amine oxidases catalyze the oxidative conversion of amines to aldehydes and ammonia in the presence of copper and quinone cofactor. This gene shows high sequence similarity to copper amine oxidases from various species ranging from bacteria to mammals. The protein contains several conserved motifs including the active site of amine oxidases and the histidine residues that likely bind copper. It may be a critical modulator of signal transmission in retina, possibly by degrading the biogenic amines dopamine, histamine, and putrescine. This gene may be a candidate gene for hereditary ocular diseases. Alternate splicing results in multiple transcript variants.

References

External links

Further reading 

EC 1.4.3
Copper enzymes